Ano Diakopto (before 1940: Πέρα Μαχαλάς - Pera Machalas) is a village and a community in the municipal unit of Diakopto, Achaea, Greece. It is 6 km southeast of Diakopto. The 2011 census showed a population of 304 for the village and 317 for the community, which includes the village of Pounta. Ano Diakopto suffered damage from the 2007 Greek forest fires.

Population

External links
 Ano Diakopto GTP Travel Pages

See also

List of settlements in Achaea

References

Aigialeia
Diakopto
Populated places in Achaea